The energy cost of transport quantifies the energy efficiency of transporting an animal or vehicle from one place to another. As a dimensionless quantity, it allows for the comparison of dissimilar animals or modes of transportation. It has a wide range of applications, from comparing human gaits to observing the change in efficiency of trains over time.

It is calculated in one of two ways, both shown in the following definition:

Alternatively, one can use the power input to the system  used to move the system at a constant velocity . The cost of transport is non-dimensional.

It is also called specific tractive force or specific resistance (see von Kármán–Gabrielli diagram), or the energy index. When the energy comes from metabolic processes (i.e., for animals), it is often called the metabolic cost of transport.

The metabolic cost of transport includes the basal metabolic cost of maintaining bodily function, and so goes to infinity as speed goes to zero.
This gives a dimensionless cost of transport of about 0.39. If only the additional metabolic cost (above the resting rate) is counted then the most efficient speed will be lower. The optimal speed if both energy and distance traveled in a given time are taken into account (with some "price" for each) may be faster or slower than the speed giving the lowest COT.

Previously it was thought that a running person (unlike running animals) uses the same energy whether they run a distance slowly or fast. More recent experiments have shown that was mistaken. Cost of transport when running does depend on speed — individual people have an optimal running speed.

References

Transport economics